Cirrocumulus stratiformis is a type of cirrocumulus cloud. The name cirrocumulus stratiformis is derived from Latin, meaning "stretched out". Cirrocumulus stratiformis occurs as very small cirrocumulus clouds that cover a large part of the sky. This type of cloud always occurs in thin layers. There can be spaces or rifts between the individual cloudlets in the layer.

See also
List of cloud types

References

External links
International Cloud Atlas – Cirrocumulus stratiformis

Cirrus
Cumulus